Henryk Jaźnicki (6 September 1917 – 25 February 2004) was a Polish football player, forward representing Polonia Warsaw and Polish National Team. Jaźnicki played in only one international friendly, without scoring a goal. His only match occurred on 27 August 1939 in Warsaw, versus Hungary (4–2). However he did not finish the game, he was replaced in the 31st minute by Stanisław Baran.

After the Second World War, Jaźnicki returned to Polonia, where he continued his career until 1952. He not only excelled in football - he also played volleyball (3 times champion of Poland), basketball (in 1947 champion of Poland) and handball (in 1947 vice-champion of Poland). During the war, he fought in the Polish September Campaign, was caught by the Germans, was a prisoner of notorious Pawiak prison in Warsaw, and was later shuttled to Sachsenhausen and Mauthausen.

References

See also 
 The last game: 27 August 1939. Poland - Hungary 4-2

1917 births
2004 deaths
Poland international footballers
Polish footballers
Polish men's basketball players
Polish men's volleyball players
Polish male handball players
Polonia Warsaw players
Polish military personnel of World War II
Sachsenhausen concentration camp survivors
Mauthausen concentration camp survivors
People from Radzyń Podlaski
Sportspeople from Lublin Voivodeship
Association football forwards
20th-century Polish people